List of professional basketball clubs in Greece:

AEK
AEL 1964 Larissa
AENK
AGEH Gymnastikos
AEP Olympias Patras
Aigaleo Athens
Amyntas Dafnis
Apollon Patras
Aries Trikala
Aris Thessaloniki
Dafni
Ethnikos Piraeus
Filathlitikos
ICBS
Ikaros
Ilysiakos Athens
Ionikos Lamias
Ionikos Neas Filadelfeias
Ionikos Nikaias
Irakleio
Iraklis Thessaloniki
KAOD
Kavala
Kolossos Rhodes
Koroivos Amaliadas
Lavrio
Makedonikos Kozani
Maroussi Athens
MENT
Milon
Near East
Olympia Larissa
Olympiacos Piraeus
Pagrati Athens
Paleo Faliro Piraeus
Panathinaikos Athens
Panelefsiniakos
Panellinios
Panionios Nea Smyrni
PAOK Thessaloniki
Papagou Athens
Peristeri Athens
Promitheas Patras
Rethymno Cretan Kings
Sporting Athens
Trikala 2000
XAN Thessaloniki
Xanthi

External links
 Official Hellenic Basketball Federation Site 
 Greek A2 Basketball League Stats
 Greek A2 News, Results, Transfers, Opinions
 Basketblog.gr 
 Greekhoopz.com 
 Greekbball.com